The Canada miner bee  (Andrena canadensis) is a species of miner bee in the family Andrenidae. Another common name for this species is the Canada andrena. It is found in North America.

References

Further reading

 
 

canadensis
Articles created by Qbugbot
Insects described in 1896